Paweł Niewrzawa (born 28 September 1992) is a Polish handball player for the Polish national team. He is currently a free agent.

He participated at the 2017 World Men's Handball Championship.

References

1992 births
Living people
Sportspeople from Gdańsk
Polish male handball players
Vive Kielce players
Expatriate handball players
Polish expatriate sportspeople in Spain
Liga ASOBAL players